Max Douglas (born 1 January 2000 in Australia) is an Australian rugby union player who plays for the  in Super Rugby. His playing position is lock. He was named in the Waratahs squad for the 2021 Super Rugby AU season. He had previously been named in the  squads for the 2020 Super Rugby season, but didn't make any appearances.

Reference list

External links
itsrugby.co.uk profile

2000 births
Australian rugby union players
Living people
Rugby union locks
New South Wales Waratahs players
Yokohama Canon Eagles players